James Reuben Gould (1 February 1914 – 25 August 1997) was a New Zealand rower.

He won a bronze medal at the 1938 British Empire Games as part of the men's eight. He was a member of the Union Boat Club (UBC) in Wanganui; fellow UBC members in the eight were Gus Jackson and Howard Benge.

References

New Zealand male rowers
Rowers at the 1938 British Empire Games
Commonwealth Games bronze medallists for New Zealand
1914 births
1997 deaths
Commonwealth Games medallists in rowing
Rowers from Whanganui
Medallists at the 1938 British Empire Games